Iliana Regan is a Michelin-starred chef and restaurateur in the Hiawatha National Forest, owner of The Milkweed Inn in Wetmore, Michigan. She received one Michelin star for each year she owned and operated Elizabeth Restaurant in Chicago, Illinois from 2012-2020.

Early life and education, 
Regan was born (1979) in Merrillville, Indiana. Her mother was a scratch cook and her steelworker father was a gardener. She and her three older sisters grew up on a 10-acre farm. She studied chemistry at Indiana University Bloomington before earning a degree in Creative writing at Columbia College Chicago. In the spring of 2022 she earned her MFAW from the School of the Art Institute of Chicago.

Career 
She worked as a waitress and as a cook in several fine-dining restaurants in Chicago, including at Trio, Schwa, and Alinea under Grant Achatz and Michael Carlson.

In 2008, Regan began selling microgreens and vegetables at farmer's markets, soon expanding her offerings to include Pierogi. In 2010, she started a weekly supper club hosting 10-12 diners in her Chicago apartment. Through the supper club, Regan met several investors interested in supporting her opening her own restaurant.

Regan named her restaurant Elizabeth for her deceased sister, opening in Chicago's Lincoln Square in 2012. Elizabeth features home-grown and foraged ingredients, originally served multi-course prix fixe menus at three 8-seat communal tables in the style of Regan's supper club. She later condensed the menu and removed the communal tables. The restaurant was immediately well-received, earning a Michelin star in its second year.

Regan opened a second restaurant in 2017, Kitsune, with Japanese influences. It closed in 2019. In July 2020 she passed on Elizabeth to her employees. She is no longer the owner of Elizabeth Restaurant. The new owners are Tim Lacey and Ian Jones is the chef. They have continued to hold the Michelin star status of the restaurant still using locally sourced products.

She and her wife, Anna, opened The Milkweed Inn, in Nahma Township in Michigan's Upper Peninsula, in 2019. The Milkweed Inn hosts 10 guests each weekend April through October at $750 to $1750 per person for a "new gatherer" culinary experience. Accommodations include three rooms inside the inn, a platform tent and a small Airstream trailer. A 2019 weekend "starts with pierogi and smoked lake trout on Friday and peaks on Saturday with a 15-course dinner that might include wild blueberries in juiced wood sorrel, young milkweed pods fried until the insides turn as silky as cheese, and moose tartare."

She published a memoir in 2019, entitled Burn the Place. The New York Times called it "perhaps the definitive Midwest drunken-lesbian food memoir." In it she describes incidents "before she got sober 10 years ago, ran away from the police in handcuffs, had sex in bar bathrooms and used her car key to administer bumps of cocaine." The New Yorker  review cited this Burn the Place as more than just a chef memoir, writing “More rightly, it belongs on a shelf with the great memoirs of addiction, of gender ambivalence and queer coming-of-age..."

In January 2023 her second memoir, Fieldwork will be published highlighting her years spent foraging and living in the woods.

Recognition 

In 2008 Chicago Magazine named her pierogi the best in the city. In 2016, Regan was named one of Food & Wine magazine's best new chefs. She was also named to the Crain's Chicago Business 40 Under 40. David Chang called her one of the best chefs he has ever known.

Regan's former restaurant, Elizabeth, earned its Michelin star in January 2020 and has maintained its Michelin status since.

Smithsonian named Burn the Place to their list of 2019's ten best books about food. Regan’s book Burn the Place was longlisted for the National Book Award in 2019, the first time in 40 years a book in food had received such recognition since Julia Child in 1979. Burn the Place won the Midland Author’s prize in non-fiction Burn the Place also won the prize in non-fiction from Story Studio Chicago.

Personal life 
Regan is married to Anna Hamlin. They met while Hamlin was working with a wine distributor and managing the Elizabeth account. Currently, they reside at Milkweed Inn with their four dogs.

References

External links
 Elizabeth Restaurant

1979 births
Living people
People from Merrillville, Indiana
Columbia College Chicago alumni
Indiana University Bloomington alumni
Chefs from Chicago
American women chefs
Head chefs of Michelin starred restaurants
Writers from Indiana
LGBT people from Indiana
21st-century American women writers
21st-century American memoirists
American women memoirists
LGBT chefs